UMM Salal is a container ship that was built in 2011 by Samsung Heavy Industries in their shipyard in Geoje, South Korea. The vessel is among the largest container ships in the world with capacity to carry 13,296 TEU or 9,600 FEU with 1,000 reefer points. The boxship has eight sister ships, operating in the fleet of UASC.

Design and engineering
With such tonnage and dimensions, the vessel has capacity to carry 13,296 TEU or 9,600 FEU.

Engineering
The main engine of the Salal is the MAN B&W 12K98ME-7, a long-stroke and low-revolution engine that has total output power of 71,760 kW.

Operational service
The Salal is deployed in Asia/Gulf Express 1 (AGX1) service of UASC. The service connects North, Central & South China, East Asia and South East Asia to the Persian Gulf and vice versa.

Accidents
On 7 April 2017, the Salal ran aground in the Strait of Malacca shortly after leaving Port Klang, Malaysia. The vessel stuck at the separation scheme at heavy traffic route.

See also
Largest container shipping companies

References

External links

UMM Salal

2011 ships
Container ships
Merchant ships of Malta